Louis Hall is an English footballer who plays as a defender for National League North side Leamington.

Career

In October 2020, Hall made his debut for Oxford City against Bath City. His first goal for the club came in a FA Cup match over Weymouth on 24 October 2020.

In July 2021 Hall joined League Two Newport County on a one year contract after impressing in pre-season trials. He made his debut for Newport on 10 August 2021 in the starting line-up for the 1–0 EFL Cup first round win against Ipswich Town.

On 25 January 2022, Hall joined National League North side Gloucester City on loan for the remainder of the 2021–22 season. He was released by Newport at the end of the 2021–22 season.

In August that year he joined Leamington. He made the bench for Leamington against Kidderminster Harriers on 13 August 2022  and his debut came three days later against Buxton on 16 August 2022. His first goal for Leamington came against Banbury United on 29 August 2022.

References

External links

Living people
Sportspeople from West Bromwich
1999 births
English footballers
Association football defenders
Oxford City F.C. players
Newport County A.F.C. players
Gloucester City A.F.C. players
National League (English football) players